The 1989 Dubai Duty Free Classic was a professional ranking snooker tournament that took place from 27 October to 3 November 1989 at the Al Nasr Stadium in Dubai, United Arab Emirates.

Stephen Hendry won the tournament, defeating Doug Mountjoy 9–2 in the final. Hendry won £40,000 in prize money while Mountjoy received £22,500 as runner-up.


Main draw

References

Dubai Classic
Dubai Classic
Dubai Classic
Dubai Classic
Dubai Classic